John Thorndike may refer to:
 John Thorndike (settler), one of the first founders of the Massachusetts Bay Colony
 John Thorndike (writer), American writer